K. C. Wu (October 21, 1903 – June 6, 1984) was a Chinese political figure and historian. Among other offices, he served as Mayor of Shanghai and as Chairman of the Taiwan Provincial Government.

Early life
Wu was born in Central China and grew up in Beijing, where his father served in the military.  He studied at both Tianjin Nankai High School, where Zhou Enlai was a classmate, and at Tsinghua University. In 1923, he earned a master's degree in economics from Grinnell College and, in 1926, a doctoral degree in political science from Princeton University.

Early career and personal life
After returning to China in 1926, Wu began a career in government service, first as a tax collector in Hankow (today part of Wuhan) for Hsia Tou-yin, a local warlord.  In 1931, he married Edith Huang, daughter of Gene T. Huang.  They eventually had four children: Eileen Wu, Edith Wu, H.K. Wu and Sherman Wu.  In 1932, he became mayor of Hankow.  When the Yangtze River appeared ready to flood in 1936, Wu oversaw the construction of a huge dike system which saved the city.

With the fall of Hankow to Japanese forces in October 1938 during the Second Sino-Japanese War, Wu and his family fled to Chungking.  In 1939, Chiang Kai-shek appointed him as mayor of Chungking, a position he held until 1942.  He served as vice minister of Foreign Affairs from 1943 to 1945, interacting with Zhou Enlai as part of the united front against the Japanese.  After the end of World War II in 1945, K.C. Wu became mayor of Shanghai, serving in that role until the Chinese Communists conquered the city in 1949.  While mayor of Shanghai, Wu met the Chicago Tribune's Robert McCormick and his wife Maryland.  As the situation in Shanghai became less stable, Wu sent his two daughters to live with the McCormicks in Illinois.

Activities after leaving mainland China
Following the relocation of the Nationalist government to Taipei, Wu served as Governor of Taiwan from 1949 to 1953. Wu attempted to bring a greater degree of self-governance to the Taiwanese people, allowing for the election of certain local officials by popular vote.  Wu also brought critics of Chen Yi into the government, and attempted to cut back on police brutality.  Wu was opposed by many conservative members of the Nationalist government, including Chiang Ching-kuo and Chen Cheng.

Wu's conflict with the younger Chiang worsened. Wu submitted his resignation to the elder Chiang but it was rejected. In April 1952, an alleged assassination targeting Wu was suspected. In April 1953, he (successfully) resigned from his position as governor and on 24 May 1953 he hastily left Taiwan on a "lecture tour". Wu's family left for the United States, except one son who was not permitted to leave by the Chiangs. In 1954, a wave of accusations appeared in Taiwan alleging Wu's corruption. At the same time, the Chiangs moved to dismiss Wu's associates from government. They also formally expelled Wu from the Kuomintang. Following his son's departure from Taiwan, Wu began to speak out against what he saw were serious problems with the Kuomintang government. That same year, Wu wrote an article in Look magazine entitled "Your Money is Building a Police State in Taiwan". The war of words between Wu and Chiang's regime escalated further, including a resolution against him by the ROC's National Assembly. Later in 1954, a war of words also erupted between Wu and Hu Shih, who was also in the United States at the time.

At that time, the United States was attempting to forge an alliance with the Taiwan Central Government in order to secure a strong military chain to keep communism at bay. Thus, the idea of fighting the police state was low on the United States agenda. Following a lack of American response to his writings, K.C. Wu lived in the United States where he served as professor of Chinese history at Armstrong Atlantic State University in Savannah, Georgia. During his time in the United States, he wrote various works, including a detailed analysis on Chinese culture in the context of mythology and early history in his book The Chinese Heritage.

Wu is remembered mainly for his vital role in the formation of a liberal modern Taiwan and his anti-communist beliefs typical of a member of Kuomintang, but he is also remembered for his outspoken anti-Kuomintang rhetoric and turbulent disagreements with the more Russian-styled Chiang Ching-kuo.

Notes

Further reading
 https://web.archive.org/web/20060901195933/http://www.faculty.armstrong.edu/FDawardR.htm
 http://www.time.com/time/covers/0,16641,1101500807,00.html 
The Chinese Heritage by K. C. Wu; 1988, Random House Value Publishing, .
"Your Money is Building a Police State in Taiwan" by K.C. Wu; Look, June 29, 1954.
The Voice of Asia by James A. Michener; 1951, Random House, .
Mechanics and Methods of Communism lecture by Dr K.C. Wu, 17 March 1955, Waelderhaus, Kohler, Wisconsin; The Sheboygan Press, March 17, 1955, p 13
Fires of the Dragon by David E. Kaplan; 2002, Scribner, .

1903 births
1984 deaths
Republic of China historians
Mayors of Shanghai
Republic of China politicians from Hubei
People from Enshi
Chairpersons of the Taiwan Provincial Government
Historians from Hubei
American writers of Chinese descent
20th-century American historians
Chinese Civil War refugees
Taiwanese people from Hubei
Expelled members of the Kuomintang